Carpathonesticus galotshkae  is a species of araneomorph spider of the family Nesticidae. It occurs in caves in the Ukrainian Eastern Carpathians.

Original publication

References 

Nesticidae
Spiders of Europe
Spiders described in 1993